Rosandra N. Kaplan (née Reich) is an American pediatric oncologist and scientist specialized in translational and clinical research on the mechanisms of cancer spread. She is a principal investigator and head of the tumor microenvironment  and metastasis branch at the National Cancer Institute.

Education 
Kaplan completed a medical degree from Dartmouth Medical School. She completed her pediatric residency training at Boston Children's Hospital and Boston Medical Center. Following residency Kaplan pursued a fellowship in pediatric hematology and oncology at Memorial Sloan-Kettering Cancer Center and Weill Cornell Medical Center, where she served as chief fellow. She did her postdoctoral research work in the laboratory of David Lyden where they discovered the concept of the Pre-metastatic niche - Wikipedia.

Career and research 
Kaplan was appointed assistant professor at Weill Cornell Medical College and assistant member at Memorial Sloan Kettering Cancer Center in 2006. In the fall of 2010, she joined the Pediatric Oncology Branch of the National Cancer Institute (NCI). She is a clinician and physician scientist with active translational and clinical research interests focused on the mechanism of cancer spread. Kaplan developed the concept of the Metastatic Niche describing the changes in distant microenvironments in response to a growing tumor that create a niche environment conducive to disseminating tumor cell survival and growth resulting in clinically relevant metastasis. Kaplan's research program focuses on developing novel biomarkers and therapeutic targets of the metastatic microenvironment by understanding the commonalities in mechanisms employed by a cancer cell to generate an entire heterogenous metastatic niche at distant sites and stem cells and their niche to repopulate tissues.

References 

Year of birth missing (living people)
Place of birth missing (living people)
Living people
American oncologists
21st-century American women scientists
21st-century American women physicians
21st-century American physicians
Memorial Sloan Kettering Cancer Center faculty
Geisel School of Medicine alumni
National Institutes of Health people
Weill Medical College of Cornell University faculty
Women oncologists
Cancer researchers
American women academics